Three Counties are traditionally the three English agrarian counties of Gloucestershire, Herefordshire and Worcestershire.

Three Counties may also refer to:

England
BBC Three Counties Radio, serving Bedfordshire, Hertfordshire and Buckinghamshire 
Three Counties System, a set of caves spanning Cumbria, Lancashire, and North Yorkshire 
Three Counties Asylum, a former psychiatric hospital serving Bedfordshire, Hertfordshire and Huntingdonshire
Three Counties railway station (disused), named after the asylum

China
The Sanyi, Three Counties, or Nanpanshun, three former counties of Nanhai, Panyu, and Shunde surrounding Guangzhou and Foshan